The Man Who Corrupted Earth is a novel by G. C. Edmondson published in 1980.

Plot summary
The Man Who Corrupted Earth is a novel about Gus Dampier, a rich eccentric who was swindled out of the directorship of his company.

Reception
Greg Costikyan reviewed The Man Who Corrupted Earth in Ares Magazine #5 and commented that "The Man Who Corrupted Earth is only the second novel I've seen by Edmonson- the excellent (and recently reprinted) The Ship that Sailed the Time Stream is the other. One awaits the next eagerly; Edmonson is a writer."

Reviews
Review by Keith Soltys (1981) in Science Fiction Review, Spring 1981

References

1980 novels